Emamzadeh Aqil (also Romanized as Emāmzādeh ‘Aqīl) is a village in Sulqan Rural District, Kan District, Tehran County, Tehran Province, Iran. At the 2006 census, its population was 18, in 5 families.

References 

Populated places in Tehran County